This a list of presidents of Leipzig University.

15th century

1409–1419

1420–1439

1440–1459

1460–1479

1480–1499

16th century

1500–1519

1520–1539

1540–1559

1560–1579

1580–1599

17th century

1600–1619

1620–1639

1640–1659

1660–1679

1680–1699

18th century

1700–1719

1720–1739

1740–1759

1760–1779

1780–1799

19th century

1800–1819

1820–1839

1840–1859

1860–1879

1880–1899

20th century

21st century

External links 
 Catalogue of presidential speeches

Leipzig University